The Hekhal Haness Synagogue is the largest synagogue in Geneva, Switzerland. On May 24, 2007, the synagogue was severely damaged by a fire.

Famous members
 Nessim Gaon

References

External links
  Site web de la synagogue Hekhal Haness
  Communauté Israélite de Genève

Synagogues in Switzerland
Buildings and structures in Geneva
Religious buildings and structures in Geneva
Orthodox Judaism in Switzerland
Orthodox synagogues
Synagogues completed in 1972
20th-century architecture in Switzerland